Valle-di-Campoloro or Valle di Campoloru, is a commune in the Haute-Corse department of France on the island of Corsica.

Population

Monuments
Église Sainte-Christine de Valle-di-Campoloro

See also
Communes of the Haute-Corse department

References

Communes of Haute-Corse